Hayato, known before launch as KSAT, or the Kagoshima Satellite, is a Japanese satellite which was launched on 20 May 2010. It is a student-built spacecraft, which is operated by Kagoshima University, and is being used for technology demonstration and atmospheric research. The satellite is a single unit CubeSat, and carries equipment to study water vapour in the Earth's atmosphere, microwave imagery and spacecraft communication.

Launch 
The launch was conducted by Mitsubishi Heavy Industries under contract to the Japan Aerospace Exploration Agency (JAXA). In preparation for a planned launch on 17 May 2010, the H-IIA launch vehicle was rolled out to Pad 1 of the Yoshinobu Launch Complex at the Tanegashima Space Center on 16 May 2010. It departed the assembly building at 21:01 UTC and arriving at the launch pad 24 minutes later at 21:25 UTC. The terminal countdown began at 11:30 UTC on 17 May 2010 and by 15:28 UTC, the loading of cryogenic propellant into the rocket's first and second stages had been completed. The launch attempt was scrubbed a few minutes before liftoff due to bad weather, but took place successfully at 21:58:22 UTC on 20 May 2010.

Mission 
Hayato was deployed from a JAXA Picosatellite Deployer attached to the second stage of the H-IIA launch vehicle used in the launch of the Akatsuki spacecraft towards Venus. KSAT shared its dispenser with the Negai satellite, whilst a second dispenser contained Waseda-SAT2. The three CubeSats separated into low Earth orbit during a coast phase of the launch, between the first and second burns of the second stage. The launch vehicle then continued to heliocentric orbit, where it deployed Akatsuki, along with the IKAROS and UNITEC-1 spacecraft. Contact with the satellite was established for 12 days only.

See also 

 List of CubeSats

References 

Satellites of Japan
Spacecraft launched in 2010
Student satellites
CubeSats
Spacecraft which reentered in 2010
Spacecraft launched by H-II rockets